Highmark is a health insurance company in Pittsburgh, Pennsylvania.

Highmark may also refer to:

 Highmark Place, or Fifth Avenue Place, Pittsburgh, Pennsylvania
 Highmark Stadium (New York), in Orchard Park, New York
 Highmark Stadium (Pennsylvania), in Pittsburgh, Pennsylvania
 Highmarking, a snowmobile activity

See also
 High water mark (disambiguation)